Mauria trichothyrsa is a species of plant in the family Anacardiaceae. It is endemic to Peru.

References

Endemic flora of Peru
trichthyrsa
Vulnerable plants
Taxonomy articles created by Polbot